The Huajiying Formation is a geological formation in Hebei, People's Republic of China. Known for its fossils including feathered dinosaurs, the age of the formation is uncertain. It may represent an early portion of the Jehol Biota, dating to somewhere in the early Cretaceous or late Jurassic periods. It may correlate with the early Cretaceous Dadianzi Formation and parts of the Yixian Formation, with an age range between 140 and 122 Ma ago. It contains the Qiaotou Member, sometimes treated as a distinct formation.

Age and stratigraphy
The Huajiying Formation contains the following members, in order from youngest to oldest:

 5th Volcanic Member
 Guohedao Sedimentary Member
 4th Volcanic Member
 Nianzigou Sedimentary Member
 3rd Volcanic Member
 Qiaotou Sedimentary Member
 2nd Volcanic Member
 Sichakou Sedimentary Member
 1st Volcanic Member

The age of the formation is uncertain. Ji and colleagues suggested in 2008 that the Qiaotou Member correlates with the Dawangzhangzi bed of the Yixian Formation, dated to ~122 Ma ago by Zhou in 2006. Ji et al. also suggested that the lower Sichakou Member correlates with the Dadianzi Formation, dated to 140 Ma ago by Tian and colleagues in 2003.

Paleobiota
The faunal lists below are based on a survey of the Huajiying Formation by Jin Fan and colleagues in 2008, unless otherwise noted.

Theropods

Fishes

Invertebrates

References

Geologic formations of China
Lower Cretaceous Series of Asia
Cretaceous China
Lagerstätten
Fossiliferous stratigraphic units of Asia
Paleontology in Hebei